Oxyparna is a genus of tephritid  or fruit flies in the family Tephritidae.

Species
Oxyparna diluta (Becker, 1908)
Oxyparna melanostigmata Korneyev, 1990

References

Tephritinae
Tephritidae genera
Diptera of Asia